Navua District is located within Serua Province in the Central Division of Fiji. During colonial times it was a sugar growing area, but the closure of the sugar mill in Navua in 1923 led to a decline in economic activity in the district. The construction of a resort at Pacific Harbour in the 1970s and an influx of tourist related activities has led to increases in economic activity in the area.

Famous people from Navua 
 C.P. Singh
 B. D. Lakshman
 Chaitanya Lakshman
 Prince Gopal Lakshman
 Paresh Narayan
 Vashist Muni
 Vishnu Deo

See also 
 Navua River
 Navua F.C.
 Ratu Suliano Matanitobua

External links 
 Map showing location of Navua

Districts of Serua Province
Viti Levu